Łagów  is a town in Kielce County, Świętokrzyskie Voivodeship, in south-central Poland. It is the seat of the gmina (administrative district) called Gmina Łagów. The village, which used to be a town from 1253 to 1869, lies at the eastern edge off the Swietokrzyskie Mountains, along National Road Nr. 74, which goes from Kielce to Zamość. Historically, Łagów belongs to Lesser Poland.

According to Jan Długosz, in the year 1085 Prince Władysław I Herman gave the settlement of Łagów to the bishops of Włocławek. The name of the village was first mentioned in documents from 1148 ("cum castro Lagow"), and it probably comes from a man named Łag or Łaga. Some time before 1230, a church was erected here, together with a Roman Catholic parish. By 1340, the Parish of Łagów had the area of 174 km2., and was very sparsely populated, due to the poor quality of soil and extensive forests.

Lagow received Magdeburg rights on April 9, 1253, which makes it one of the oldest towns of Lesser Poland. This was due to the efforts of Prince of Kraków and Sandomierz, Boleslaw V the Chaste, as during his reign, several other locations in Lesser Poland were granted town charters in a short period of time (Bochnia and Łagów in 1253; Kraków in 1257; Skaryszew in 1264; Skała in 1267; Koprzywnica in 1268; Jędrzejów and Opatowiec in 1271; Mstow in 1278, Nowe Brzesko in 1279).

In the 14th century, several villages were founded around Łagów (Piotrow, Wola Lagowska, Sadkow, Gesice, Lechowek). On July 28, 1375, Queen Elizabeth of Poland issued a privilege, which allowed the Bishop of Wloclawek to found a new town, located in the area of the village Stary Łagów. The town was named Nowy Łagów, and remained in the hands of the bishops of Wloclawek. In the early 16th century Łagów emerged as a local center of glass industry, with three plants established here by bishops Maciej Drzewicki and Jan Karnkowski. The town had a voigt, hospital, town hall, and stone church. In the late 16th century, Lagow became famous for its pottery, which was sold as far away as Kraków and Biecz.

In September 1502 the town, which was part of the Sandomierz Voivodeship, was burned in a Crimean Tatar raid, but it was quickly rebuilt, and exempted from all taxes for the period of 12 years. In 1534, three iron ore mines and a bloomery operated here. In 1581-1600, Bishop of Wloclawek Henryk Rozdrazewski founded a Gothic – style church. Łagów burned to the ground in ca. 1575, and in ca. 1630, its population was 1,150. Apart from iron ore, lead and lime were mined in the area of the town. Swedish invasion of Poland (1655–1660) brought widespread destruction, followed by an epidemic (1662), which decimated the population. By 1663, the population of Łagów shrank to 170 residents

After the Partitions of Poland, Łagów briefly belonged to the Habsburg Empire, and since 1815 it was part of Russian-controlled Congress Poland. In the 1820s, the government of Congress Poland, on initiative of Stanisław Staszic, initiated the program of Old-Polish Industrial Region, together with construction of blast furnaces in Łagów. The program was abandoned due to the November Uprising. The town declined, and following the failed January Uprising, Russian government reduced it to the status of a village (1869), as a punishment for the support of Polish rebels. In 1884, the population of Łagów was 2,000.

The village, which in the Second Polish Republic belonged to Kielce Voivodeship, was seized by the Wehrmacht on September 7, 1939 (see Invasion of Poland). In late 1944, Łagów was located along front line, which resulted in almost complete destruction of the village, and the death of some 1,500 residents.

Among points of interest in Łagów there are:
 15th-century parish church, with a 17th-century nave and late Renaissance altar (ca. 1600). The church was partly destroyed in September 1944,
 medieval layout of streets, together with a market square,
 19th-century cemetery, with a chapel,
 Łagów is starting point of blue tourist trails to Chęciny, and green trail to Nowa Słupia.

In the Dule Gorge, near Łagów, there is the so-called Jaskinia Zbojecka (The Robber’s Cave), one of the earliest known caves in the region. Its length is 160 meters, and is located at the height of 312 meters above sea level. Inside there are stalactites and stalagmite, and several kinds of bats. Archaeologists found there pottery and bones of domesticated animals from the 11th or 12th century.

References

Villages in Kielce County
Sandomierz Voivodeship
Radom Governorate
Kielce Voivodeship (1919–1939)